Pivoting is an American comedy television series created by Liz Astrof that premiered on Fox on January 9, 2022, and ended on March 10, 2022. In May 2022, the series was canceled after one season.

Premise
After the sudden death of their friend Coleen, three middle-aged friends, Amy, Jodie and Sarah, decide that life is short and they must "pivot" their lives in new directions. As they each make impulsive choices in an attempt to find happiness, it strengthens their friendship.

Cast and characters

Main

 Eliza Coupe as Amy, a local morning talk show producer and workaholic who commits to spending more time with her children despite her fear of familial responsibility
 Ginnifer Goodwin as Jodie, a mother of three children who develops a crush on her trainer while trying to achieve a lifelong fitness goal
 Maggie Q as Sarah, a surgeon who gives up her stressful career to become a cashier at a grocery store and recently divorced her wife
 Tommy Dewey as Henry, Amy's husband
 Robert Baker as Dan, Jodie’s husband  
 Colton Dunn as Brian, Coleen's husband who is now a widower 
 JT Neal as Matt, Jodie's trainer
 Marcello Reyes as Luke, Amy's 7-year old son

Recurring
 Audrey Gerthoffer as Andrea, Jodie’s teenage daughter who runs a social media beauty channel
 Connie Jackson as Gloria, Amy’s nanny

Episodes

Production

Development
On February 6, 2020, Pivoting was given a pilot order by Fox. The pilot is written by Liz Astrof and directed by Tristram Shapeero. On May 10, 2021, Pivoting was picked to series by Fox. The series is created by Astrof who is expected to executive produce alongside Shapeero, Aaron Kaplan, and Dana Honor. Production companies involved with the series are Kapital Entertainment,  Warner Bros. Television, and Fox Entertainment. The series premiered on January 9, 2022. On May 13, 2022, Fox canceled the series after one season.

Casting
On April 21, 2020, Eliza Coupe and Tommy Dewey were cast to star. On May 20, 2020, Ginnifer Goodwin joined the main cast. On September 17, 2020, JT Neal was cast as a series regular. On December 8, 2020, Maggie Q joined the cast in a starring role. When Pivoting was picked to series, Marcello Reyes was also listed as a main cast member.

Reception

Critical response
The review aggregator website Rotten Tomatoes reported a 100% approval rating with an average rating of 7/10, based on 10 critic reviews. Metacritic, which uses a weighted average, assigned a score of 67 out of 100 based on 10 critics, indicating "generally favorable reviews".

Ratings

References

External links
 
 Production website
 

2020s American comedy television series
2020s American LGBT-related comedy television series
2022 American television series debuts
2022 American television series endings
English-language television shows
Fox Broadcasting Company original programming
Television series by Fox Entertainment
Television series by Kapital Entertainment
Television series by Warner Bros. Television Studios
Television shows set in Long Island
Works about friendship